Edenbridge railway station is one of two stations serving Edenbridge in Kent, England. It is  measured from  via . Train services are operated by Southern.

History
The station was opened on 26 May 1842.

In 1967 the station became unstaffed following which the original station buildings were demolished.

In 1993 the line was electrified and services started to run through to London rather than being an extension of the Reading to Redhill North Downs Line service.

In 2007, a PERTIS machine was installed at the street entrance to the Tonbridge-bound platform. This has since been replaced with a self-service ticket vending machine as common on larger stations. Until December 2008 Edenbridge station was operated by Southeastern before it transferred to Southern, whose green signage was installed before October 2008.

Facilities
Edenbridge station is unstaffed and facilities are limited. Tickets can be purchased from the self-service ticket machine at the station and there are passenger help points located on each platforms. There is also a basic shelter located on each platform. The station has a free car park (operated by Saba Parking).

The  bound platform is accessible without steps although the  bound platform is only reachable through the use of steps.

Bus Connections
The station is served by the following bus services:
 Metrobus routes 231 & 233 to Penshurst and Tunbridge Wells (Monday-Saturday)
 Southdown PSV route 236 to Oxted, Westerham and East Grinstead (Monday-Friday)
 Go-Coach route E1 in a circular route around Edenbridge (Monday-Friday)

Services
All services at Edenbridge are operated by Southern using Class 377 EMUs. 

The typical off-peak service in trains per hour is:
 1 tph to 
 1 tph to 

Services increase to 2 tph in each direction during the peak hours.

See also
 Edenbridge Town railway station, the other station in the town

References

External links

Edenbridge, Kent
Railway stations in Kent
DfT Category F1 stations
Former South Eastern Railway (UK) stations
Railway stations in Great Britain opened in 1842
Railway stations served by Govia Thameslink Railway
1842 establishments in England